Cryptandra longistaminea is a species of flowering plant in the family Rhamnaceae and is endemic to eastern Australia. It is a shrub with many branches, egg-shaped or elliptic to linear leaves, and clusters of white, tube-shaped flowers.

Description
The edges of the leaves are curved downwards, the upper surface glabrous, the lower surface densely covered with white, star-shaped hairs. Flowering occurs from June to September.

Taxonomy and naming
Cryptandra longistaminea was first formally described in 1862 by Ferdinand von Mueller in Fragmenta Phytographiae Australiae from specimens collected near the Severn River. The specific epithet (longistaminea) means "long stamens".

Distribution and habitat
This cryptandra mainly grows in open forest, south from about Gladstone in south-eastern Queensland to Grafton in New South Wales. It also occurs in scattered populations north from Gilgandra on the slopes and in mallee communities north of Hillston in inland New South Wales.

References

longistaminea
Rosales of Australia
Flora of Queensland
Flora of New South Wales
Plants described in 1862
Taxa named by Ferdinand von Mueller